Adam Simac  (born August 9, 1983) is a Canadian male volleyball player. He was part of the Canada men's national volleyball team at the 2014 FIVB Volleyball Men's World Championship in Poland. He played for Energy Investments Lugano.

Clubs
 ACH Volley Bled/Ljubljana (2010-2012)
 Arkas Izmir Volleybol Klub (2012-2013)
 Pallavolo Lugano (2013-2014)
 ASUL Lyon Volleyball (2014-2015)

References

1983 births
Living people
Canadian men's volleyball players
Pan American Games bronze medalists for Canada
Sportspeople from Ottawa
Volleyball players at the 2015 Pan American Games
Pan American Games medalists in volleyball
Medalists at the 2015 Pan American Games